Kiryat Ye'arim Youth Village is a youth village in central Israel. Located near Kiryat Ye'arim and to the north of Abu Ghosh, it falls under the jurisdiction of Mateh Yehuda Regional Council.

History
The village was established in 1952 with a donation from Swiss Jews. Yisrael Katz, later a government minister, ran the village between 1954 and 1959.

References

Youth villages in Israel
Jewish Agency for Israel
Populated places established in 1952
Populated places in Jerusalem District
1952 establishments in Israel